CI Records is an independent record label in Lancaster, Pennsylvania owned by Jeremy Weiss. Originally created to distribute the releases of his band, Stand Up, an early 1990s melodic hardcore band. Weiss also operates the physical record store, CI Records & Skates in Downtown Lancaster.

Albums by Jeff Caudill, Sense Field, The Juliana Theory and Jonah Matranga's (of Far, New End Original, Gratitude, and Onelinedrawing) followed after the initial success. Notable artists to sign with CI have included Texas In July, The Pink Spiders, Carousel Kings, Once Nothing, Sadaharu, Fire Deuce (The side project of Coheed and Cambria's Travis Stever), and Movies with Heroes. CI Records is also the homebase of the LAUNCH Music Conference & Festival, held annually in Lancaster.

The label owes its name to a punk rock band once played in founder Jeremy Weiss, called Corrupted Image, from which the initials were used.

Current roster 

 A Scent Like Wolves
 Gladiators
Dre Powe
 Lexxe
 Poeta
 The Road to Milestone

Past roster 

 Albert React
 An Early Ending
 August Burns Red (Active, on SharpTone Records)
 Carousel Kings (Active, on Victory Records)
 Centerfolds
 Circus Circus
 Fire Deuce
 Jeff Caudill
 Hoping for the Better
 Home Sweet Home
 Hometruths
 The Juliana Theory (disbanded, one member playing solo)
 Movies with Heroes
 Muddfoot
 Once Nothing (Active, unsigned)
 Onelinedrawing
 One Year Later
 The Pavers
 The Pink Spiders
 Que Sera
 Running from Dharma
 Sadaharu
 Sense Field
 Serpico
 Stand Up
 Submachine
 Three Steps Up
 Texas In July (disbanded)
 Time Has Come
 Vision
 Cancerous Reagans
 Violent Society
 The Memory
 Where the Ocean Meets the Sky
 The Woodsmans Babe

See also
 List of record labels

References

External links
 Official site

Record labels established in 1989
American independent record labels
Alternative rock record labels
Indie rock record labels
Rock record labels